Kanitz may refer to:

People
 August Kanitz, (1843–1896), Hungarian botanist 
 August Wilhelm Graf von Kanitz (1783–1852), Prussian Lieutenant General and Minister of War 
 Ernest Kanitz (1894–1978), composer; see Houston Bright
 Felix Philipp Kanitz (1829–1904), ethnographer
 Gerhard von Kanitz (1885–1949), German politician
 Hans von Kanitz (1841–1913), German politician
 Katrin Kanitz, athlete
 Miklos Kanitz (born 1938), Holocaust survivor
 Otto Felix Kanitz (1894–1940), educator

Other uses
 Kanitz v. Rogers Cable Inc.
 German name of Dolní Kounice, Czech Republic
 German name of Olszewo Węgorzewskie, Poland